Mark Eugene Wiley (born February 28, 1948) is the former Director of Pitching Operations for the Colorado Rockies. Wiley only pitched in parts of two Major League Baseball seasons, however, he has remained in the game as a pitching coach and front office executive for over forty years.

Minnesota Twins
Wiley was drafted by the Minnesota Twins in the second round of the 1970 Major League Baseball Draft. He went 9-1 with a 2.15 ERA to earn a call up to Minnesota that June. Wiley went 2-3 with a 6.05 ERA mostly as a reliever his only season in Minnesota, however, he earned a complete game victory in the second game of a doubleheader with the California Angels for his first major league win.

San Diego Padres
After spending the entire  season with Tacoma, he was cut during Spring training . He signed a minor league deal with the San Diego Padres shortly afterwards, and had a PCL leading sixteen victories for the Hawaii Islanders in 1977.

He earned a call up to the majors in June , and was effective in his first three appearances (1-0, 1.29 ERA, while holding batters to a .185 batting average), until a July 7 outing against the Atlanta Braves. In two thirds of an inning, he allowed four earned runs, and also allowed two inherited runners to score. He returned to Hawaii shortly afterwards.

Toronto Blue Jays
That September, he was traded to the Toronto Blue Jays for minor league outfielder Andrew Dyes. He made two appearances for the Jays, in blowout losses to the New York Yankees and Boston Red Sox.

During Spring training , he was traded to the California Angels for fellow right handed pitcher Mike Barlow. He was released by the Angels without making an appearance at any level. He caught on with the Baltimore Orioles, and spent the 1980 season with the Rochester Red Wings before retiring, and going into coaching.

Coaching
Barely a month into his new job, Wiley was fined & suspended for bumping an umpire. He led the team to a 74-69 record.

He remained a coach in their minor league system until , when he was added to the major league staff under new manager Cal Ripken, Sr. After just one season, in which the Orioles went 67-95 with a 5.01 ERA (second worst in the American League), Wiley resigned. A month later, he became pitching coach of the Cleveland Indians, who had the worst ERA in the AL in 1987.

With Wiley on board, the Indians' staff ERA improved more than one run per game in  (4.16, from 5.28 in 1987). In , it improved to 3.65, fifth best in the American League. After a disastrous  season, in which the Indians lost 105 games, Wiley was replaced as pitching coach by Rick Adair, however, he accepted another position within the organization. From -, he served as a special assignment scout.

He was again offered another position in the organization following his dismissal as pitching coach, but declined. Shortly afterwards, he accepted a job as pitching coach with the Kansas City Royals. After just one season in Kansas City, Wiley resigned, and accepted a front office position with the Colorado Rockies.

He left the Rockies' front office to become pitching coach for the Florida Marlins on November 9, . He was, however, fired after just one season, in which the Marlins went 83-79 with a 4.16 ERA. He returned to his front office job with the Rockies for two years, until returning to the Marlins' dugout for the  season. He was fired at the end of the  season despite the Marlins finishing twelve games about .500 with the lowest payroll in baseball. On October 24, 2021, Wiley announced his retirement.

References

External links

Venezuelan Winter League

1948 births
Living people
American expatriate baseball players in Canada
Auburn Twins players
Baltimore Orioles coaches
Baseball players from California
Cal Poly Pomona Broncos baseball players
California Polytechnic State University alumni
Charlotte Hornets (baseball) players
Cleveland Indians coaches
Cleveland Indians scouts
Florida Marlins coaches
Hawaii Islanders players
Kansas City Royals coaches
Major League Baseball pitchers
Major League Baseball pitching coaches
Minnesota Twins players
Minor league baseball managers
Navegantes del Magallanes players
American expatriate baseball players in Venezuela
Orlando Twins players
People from National City, California
Rochester Red Wings managers
San Diego Padres players
Syracuse Chiefs players
Tigres de Aragua players
Toronto Blue Jays players